Christine Papin (8 March 1905 – 18 May 1937) and Léa Papin (15 September 1911 – July 24, 2001) were two French sisters who, as live-in maids, were convicted of murdering their employer's wife and daughter in Le Mans on February 2, 1933.

The murder had a significant influence on French intellectuals such as Jean Genet, Jean-Paul Sartre, Simone de Beauvoir, and Jacques Lacan, and was considered symbolic of class struggle by leftist polemicists. The case formed the basis of a number of publications, plays, and films, as well as essays, spoken word, songs, and artwork.

Life

Christine (b. 8 March 1905) and Léa Papin (b. 15 September 1911) were born in Le Mans to Clémence Derré and Gustave Papin. While Clémence was dating Gustave, it was rumored that she was having an affair with her employer. However, after she became pregnant, Gustave married her in October 1901. Five months later, her first daughter, Émilia, was born. 

Suspecting that Clémence was still having an affair with her employer, Gustave found a new job in another city and announced the family would move. Clémence declared she would rather take her own life than leave Le Mans. The marriage deteriorated. Gustave began to drink heavily.

Early life

Christine was born on March 8, 1905. However, her mother was considered not to be nurturing and deemed unsuitable for motherhood. Christine was given to her paternal aunt and uncle soon after birth. She lived happily with them for seven years. 

Léa was born on September 15, 1911, and given to her maternal uncle, with whom she remained until he died. In 1912, when Émilia was 9 or 10 years old, it was alleged that Gustave had raped her. Clémence believed that Émilia had seduced her father and sent her to the Bon Pasteur Catholic Orphanage, which was known for its discipline. Soon afterward, Émilia was joined by Christine and Léa, who Clémence intended would remain at the orphanage until age 15, when they could be employed. Clémence and Gustave divorced in 1903 or 1913.

In 1918, Émilia decided to enter a convent, effectively ending her relations with her family. As far as can be ascertained, she lived out the remainder of her life there.

During Christine's time at the orphanage, she also received the calling to become a nun. Clémence forbade this, instead placing her in employment. Christine had been trained in various household duties in the convent, easing her into becoming a live-in maid.  Christine was described as a hard worker and a good cook who could be insubordinate at times. 

Léa was described as quiet, introverted, and obedient but was considered less intelligent than Christine. Employers were content with their work; however, Clémence was not satisfied with their pay and forced them to seek better-paid opportunities.

The sisters worked as maids in various Le Mans homes. They preferred to work together whenever possible.

Crimes

In 1926, Christine and Léa found live-in positions as maids at 6 rue Bruyère for the Lancelin family; Monsieur René Lancelin, a retired solicitor, his wife Madame Léonie Lancelin, and their younger daughter Genevieve lived in the house (the elder daughter was married). After a few months of excellent service, Christine convinced Madame Lancelin to hire Léa as a chambermaid. The two girls dedicated their lives to working long days doing their job. However, some years after Christine and Léa started working for the family, Madame Léonie developed depression and the girls became the target of her mental illness. She began to scrutinize the cleaning and had become critical of the job done. There were various occasions of Madame Lancelin reportedly physically assaulting the girls. The abuse worsened: at its peak she would slam the girls' heads against the wall.

On the evening of Thursday, February 2, 1933, Monsieur Lancelin was supposed to meet Madame Léonie and Genevieve for dinner at the home of a family friend. Madame Léonie and Genevieve had been out shopping that day. When they returned home that afternoon, no lights were on in the house. The Papin sisters explained to Madame Lancelin that the power outage had been caused by Christine plugging in a faulty iron. Madame Lancelin became irritated and attacked the sisters on the first-floor landing. Christine lunged at Genevieve and gouged her eyes out. Léa joined in the struggle and attacked Madame Lancelin, gouging her eyes out as ordered by Christine. Christine ran downstairs to the kitchen where she retrieved a knife and a hammer. She brought both weapons upstairs, where the sisters continued their attack. At some point, one of the sisters grabbed a heavy pewter pitcher and used it to strike the heads of both Lancelin women. In the midst of the rage, they mutilated the buttocks and thighs of the victims. 

Some time later, Monsieur Lancelin returned home to find the house dark. He assumed that his wife and daughter had left for the dinner party and proceeded to the party himself. When he arrived at his friend's home, he found that his family was not there. He returned to his residence with his son-in-law at approximately 18:30 or 19:00, where they discovered the entire house still dark except for a light in the Papin sisters' room. The front door was bolted shut from the inside, so they were unable to enter the house. The two men found this suspicious and went to a local police station to summon help from an officer. Together with the policeman, they returned to the Lancelin home where the policeman made entry into the home by climbing over the garden wall. 

Once inside, he found the bodies of Madame Lancelin and her daughter Genevieve. They had both been bludgeoned and stabbed to the point of being unrecognizable. Madame Lancelin's eyes had been gouged out and were found in the folds of the scarf around her neck, and one of Genevieve's eyes was found under her body and another on the stairs at the other end of the hallway. Thinking that the Papin sisters had met the same fate, the policeman continued upstairs only to find the door to the Papin sisters' room locked. 

After the officer knocked but received no response, he summoned a locksmith to open the door. Inside the room, he found the Papin sisters naked in bed together, and a bloody hammer, with hair still clinging to it, on a chair nearby. 

Under questioning, the sisters immediately confessed to the killing.

Trial and imprisonment

The sisters confessed to the murder immediately; however, they claimed that it had been committed in self-defense. During the trial, the sisters protected each other and each confessed sole responsibility for the crimes committed. The sisters were placed in prison and separated from each other. 

Christine became extremely distressed because she could not see Léa. At one point, prison officials relented and allowed the two sisters to meet. Christine reportedly threw herself at Léa, unbuttoning her blouse, begging her "Please, say yes!" suggesting an incestuous sexual relationship.

In July 1933, Christine experienced a "fit", or episode, in which she tried to gouge her own eyes out and had to be put in a straitjacket. She then made a statement to the investigating magistrate, in which she said that on the day of the murders she had experienced an episode like the one she just had in prison and that this was what precipitated the murders.

The sisters' chosen lawyer pleaded not guilty by reason of insanity on behalf of them. Christine and Léa demonstrated signs of mental illness such as limiting eye contact and staring straight ahead appearing to be in a daze. The court appointed three doctors to administer psychological evaluations of the sisters to determine their mental state. They concluded that the two had no mental disorders and deemed them sane and fit to stand trial. They also believed that Christine's affection for her sister was based on family ties, not an incestuous relationship as others had suggested.

However, during the September 1933 trial, medical testimony noted a history of mental illness in the family. Their uncle had died by suicide, while their cousin was living in an asylum. The psychological community struggled and debated over a diagnosis for the sisters. 

After much consideration, it was concluded that Christine and Léa suffered from "Shared Paranoid Disorder", which is believed to occur when groups or pairs of people are isolated from the world, developing paranoia, and in which one partner dominates the other. This was especially true of Léa, whose meek personality was overshadowed by the obstinate and dominant Christine. 

After the trial, jurors took 40 minutes to determine that the Papin sisters were indeed guilty of the crime of which they had been accused. Léa, thought to be under the influence of her older sister, was given a 10-year sentence. Christine was initially sentenced to death at the guillotine, although that sentence was later commuted to life imprisonment.

Deaths
The separation from Léa proved to be too much for Christine. Her condition deteriorated rapidly once they were apart. She had written various letters pleading to be with Léa; however, her wish was not to be granted. She experienced bouts of depression and "madness", eventually refusing to eat. Prison officials transferred her to a mental institution in Rennes, hoping that she would benefit from professional help. Still separated from Léa, she continued to starve herself until she died of cachexia ("wasting away") on May 18, 1937.

Léa fared better than Christine, serving only eight years of her 10-year sentence due to good behavior in prison. After her release in 1941, she lived in the town of Nantes, where she was joined by her mother. She assumed a false identity and earned a living as a hotel maid.

Some accounts state that Léa died in 1982, but French film producer Claude Ventura claims to have discovered Léa living in a hospice center in France in 2000 while creating the film En Quête des Soeurs Papin (in English In Search of the Papin Sisters). The woman he claimed to be Léa had suffered a stroke which had rendered her partially paralyzed and unable to speak. This woman died in 2001.

The sisters are buried together in the Cimeterie Boutellerie in Nantes.

Works inspired by the case
 The Maids (Les Bonnes), a play by Jean Genet
 The Maids, a film based on the play, directed by Christopher Miles
 My Sister in This House, a play by Wendy Kesselman
 Sister My Sister, a 1994 film by Nancy Meckler, adapted from her play
 Les Abysses, a film directed by Nikos Papatakis
 La Cérémonie, a film directed by Claude Chabrol
 Violets, a 2015 short film directed by Jim Vendiola
 Les Soeurs Papin, a book by R. le Texier
 Blood Sisters, a stage play and screenplay by Neil Paton
 L'Affaire Papin, a book by Paulette Houdyer
 La Solution du passage à l'acte, a book by Francis Dupré
 "The Murder in Le Mans", an essay in Paris Was Yesterday by Janet Flanner
 La Ligature, a short film by Gilles Cousin
 Les Meurtres par Procuration, a book by Jean-Claude Asfour
 Lady Killers, a book by Joyce Robins
 Minotaure #3, 1933, a magazine
 The Maids, an opera by Peter Bengtson
 Les Blessures assassines (English : Murderous Maids), a film by Jean-Pierre Denis
 En Quete des Soeurs Papin (In Search of the Papin Sisters), a documentary film by Claude Ventura
 Gros Proces des l'Histoire, a book by M. Mamouni
 L'Affaire Papin, a book by Genevieve Fortin
 The Papin Sisters, a book by Rachel Edwards and Keith Reader
 The Maids, artwork by Dame Paula Rego
 Anna la bonne, a 1934 "spoken song" written by Jean Cocteau and performed by Marianne Oswald. This was inspired by Poe's Annabel Lee rather than the Papin case, but it influences Genet's "Les Bonnes".
 Possibly "Tomorrow," episode 2.7 of the television series Law & Order Criminal Intent
 Deadly Women (Double Trouble)
 Maids, a comic by Katie Skelly
 Parasite, a film by Bong Joon-ho

Les Bonnes by Jean Genet

The play Les Bonnes by French writer Jean Genet often is thought to be based on the Papin sisters, although Genet said this was not the case. However, the play deals with the plight of two French maids who resemble the Papin sisters, and highlights the dissatisfaction of the maids with their lot in life, which manifests itself in a hatred for their mistress. Genet's interest in the crime of the Papin sisters stemmed at least partly from his contempt for the middle classes, along with his understanding of how a murderer could glory in the infamy that came from the crime.

See also
 Case of Aimée
 Popular Front (France), for more on the political climate of the times.

References

Bibliography

Further reading

External links

  
 

1933 murders in Europe
Criminal duos
French murderers
Sibling duos